In enzymology, a N-acylmannosamine 1-dehydrogenase is an enzyme that catalyzes the chemical reaction

N-acyl-D-mannosamine + NAD+  N-acyl-D-mannosaminolactone + NADH + H+

Thus, the two substrates of this enzyme are N-acyl-D-mannosamine and NAD+, whereas its 3 products are N-acyl-D-mannosaminolactone, NADH, and H+.

This enzyme belongs to the family of oxidoreductases, specifically those acting on the CH-OH group of donor with NAD+ or NADP+ as acceptor. The systematic name of this enzyme class is N-acyl-D-mannosamine:NAD+ 1-oxidoreductase. Other names in common use include N-acylmannosamine dehydrogenase, N-acetyl-D-mannosamine dehydrogenase, N-acyl-D-mannosamine dehydrogenase, and N-acylmannosamine dehydrogenase.

References

 

EC 1.1.1
NADH-dependent enzymes
Enzymes of unknown structure